Ethmia pingxiangensis is a moth in the family Depressariidae. It was described by You-Qiao Liu in 1980. It is found in Guangxi, China.

Adults resemble Ethmia hainanensis and Ethmia acontias, but can be distinguished by the continuation and breaks in the three black stripes on the forewings.

References

Moths described in 1980
pingxiangensis